TVR 1 (spelled out as Televiziunea Română 1, "Romanian Television 1") is the main channel of the Romanian public broadcaster TVR.

In 1985, Programul 1 renamed again to TVR becoming the sole television channel in Romania.

In 1989, TVR1 broadcast live the events of the revolt which triggered the fall of the Communist regime, covering almost all the main events live, starting from the last speech of Nicolae Ceauşescu (on December 21, 1989) until the new power representatives arrived. At the time, fabricated and exaggerated stories were broadcast, nevertheless TVR1 was the first television channel to cover all the events of the regime change.

After TVR HD was closed, TVR 1 has launched an HD broadcast on November 3, 2019, with its other sister channel, TVR 2. TVR is also testing HD broadcasting on its other channels, but momentarily, the HD broadcasts are only available on its on-demand service, TVR+.

Popular programs

Serial television programs

TVR1 airs series such as:
Awake
Battlestar Galactica
Being Erica
Body of Proof
Brothers & Sisters
Castle
Cold Case
Combat Hospital
CSI: Crime Scene Investigation
CSI: Miami
CSI: NY
Dallas
Deadwood
Desperate Housewives
Downton Abbey
Enlightened
Eureka
Flash Gordon
The Following
Girls
The Good Wife
Grey's Anatomy
The Grim Adventures of Billy & Mandy
Homeland
Hot in Cleveland
The Hunger Games
Hunted
In Treatment
Iron Man: Armored Adventures
JAG
The Legend of Korra
Modern Family
NCIS
NCIS: Los Angeles
New Girl
Oggy and the Cockroaches
The Pacific
Primeval
Primeval: New World
Rescue Me
Rookie Blue
Rugrats
Star Trek: Deep Space Nine
Star Trek: Enterprise
Star Trek: The Next Generation
Star Trek: Voyager
Star Wars: The Clone Wars
Strike Back
The Walking Dead
Lost
Hannah Montana
Saw movie series
Mad Men
House M.D.

Entertainment programs
Down The Road: Aventura
Vedeta Populară

International competitions
Eurovision Song Contest
Junior Eurovision Song Contest
Miss Universe Pageant

Program for minorities
Romanian TV airs the following channels for minority nationwide:
Kronika (Hungarian)
Magazin în limba maghiară (Hungarian)
Akzente (German)
Magazin în limba germană (German)

See also
 Television in Romania

References

External links
 tvr.ro
 http://tvr1.tvr.ro/

Eastern Bloc mass media
1
Television channels and stations established in 1956
Television stations in Romania